Piletocera fulvalis is a moth in the family Crambidae. It was described by George Hampson in 1907. It is found in Guyana.

References

fulvalis
Moths described in 1907
Taxa named by George Hampson
Moths of South America